Hyundai Motor Company, often abbreviated to Hyundai Motors 
and commonly known as Hyundai, is a South Korean multinational automotive manufacturer headquartered in Seoul, South Korea, and founded in 1967. Currently, the company owns 33.88 percent of Kia Corporation, and also fully owns two marques including its luxury cars subsidiary, Genesis Motor, and an electric vehicle sub-brand, Ioniq. Those three brands altogether comprise the Hyundai Motor Group.

Hyundai operates the world's largest integrated automobile manufacturing facility in Ulsan, South Korea which has an annual production capacity of 1.6 million units. The company employs about 75,000 people worldwide. Hyundai vehicles are sold in 193 countries through 5,000 dealerships and showrooms.

History

Chung Ju-Yung (1915–2001) founded the Hyundai Engineering and Construction Company in 1947. Hyundai Motor Company was later established in 1967, and the company's first model, the Cortina, was released in cooperation with Ford Motor Company in 1968. When Hyundai wanted to develop their own car, they hired George Turnbull in February 1974, the former managing director of Austin Morris at British Leyland. He in turn hired five other top British car engineers. They were body designer Kenneth Barnett, engineers John Simpson and Edward Chapman, John Crosthwaite, formerly of BRM, as chassis engineer and Peter Slater as chief development engineer. In 1975, the Pony, the first South Korean car, was released, with styling by Giorgio Giugiaro of ItalDesign and powertrain technology provided by Japan's Mitsubishi Motors. Exports began in the following year to Ecuador and soon thereafter to the Benelux countries. Hyundai entered the British market in 1982, selling 2993 cars in their first year there.

In 1984, Hyundai began exporting the Pony to Canada, but not to the United States, as the Pony would not pass emissions standards there. Canadian sales greatly exceeded expectations, and it was at one point the top-selling car on the Canadian market. In 1985, the one millionth Hyundai car was built. Until the 1986 introduction of the larger Hyundai Grandeur, Hyundai offered a locally assembled Ford Granada for the South Korean executive market. The import of these knocked down kits was permitted as long as Hyundai exported five cars for every single Granada brought in (the same demands were placed on Kia).

In 1986, Hyundai began to sell cars in the United States, and the Excel was nominated as "Best Product #10" by Fortune magazine, largely because of its affordability. The company began to produce models with its own technology in 1988, beginning with the midsize Sonata. In the spring of 1990, aggregate production of Hyundai automobiles reached the four million mark. In 1991, the company succeeded in developing its first proprietary gasoline engine, the four-cylinder Alpha, and also its own transmission, thus paving the way for technological independence.

In 1996, Hyundai Motor India Limited was established with a production plant in Irungattukottai near Chennai, India.

In 1998, Hyundai began to overhaul its image in an attempt to establish itself as a world-class brand. Chung Ju Yung transferred leadership of Hyundai Motor to his son, Chung Mong Koo, in 1999. Hyundai's parent company, Hyundai Motor Group, invested heavily in the quality, design, manufacturing, and long-term research of its vehicles. It added a 10-year or  warranty to cars sold in the United States and launched an aggressive marketing campaign.

In 2004, Hyundai was ranked second in "initial quality" in a survey/study by J.D. Power and Associates in North America. Hyundai is now one of the top 100 most valuable brands worldwide according to Interbrand. Since 2002, Hyundai has also been one of the worldwide official sponsors of the FIFA World Cup.

In 2006, the South Korean government initiated an investigation of Chung Mong Koo's practices as head of Hyundai, suspecting him of corruption. On 28 April 2006, Chung was arrested, and charged for embezzlement of 100 billion South Korean won (US$106 million). As a result, Hyundai vice chairman and CEO, Kim Dong-jin, replaced him as head of the company.

On 30 September 2011, Yang Seung Suk announced his retirement as CEO of Hyundai Motor Co. In the interim replacement period, Chung Mong-koo and Kim Eok-jo will divide the duties of the CEO position.

In 2014, Hyundai started an initiative to focus on improving vehicle dynamics in its vehicles and hired Albert Biermann, former Vice President of Engineering at BMW M to direct chassis development for Hyundai vehicles; stating "The company intends to become a technical leader in ride and handling, producing vehicles that lead their respective segments for driver engagement."

On 14 October 2020, Euisun Chung was inaugurated as the new chairman of the Hyundai Motor Group. His father, Chung Mong-Koo, has been made Honourary Chairman.

In April 2021, the company said that its profits rose by 187%, the highest rise in four years. The company recorded a profit of $1.16 billion from the beginning of 2021 until March.

Research and development 
Hyundai has six research and development centers, located in South Korea (three offices), Germany, Japan and India. Additionally, a center in California develops designs for the United States.

Hyundai established the Hyundai Design Center in Fountain Valley, California in 1990. The center moved to a new $30 million facility in Irvine, California, in 2003, and was renamed the Hyundai Kia Motors Design and Technical Center. The facility also housed Hyundai America Technical Center, Inc, a subsidiary responsible for all engineering activities in the U.S. for Hyundai. Hyundai America Technical Center moved to its new , $117 million headquarters in Superior Township, Michigan (near Ann Arbor) in 2005.

In 2004, Hyundai America Technical Center completed construction of its Hyundai/Kia proving ground in California City, California. The  facility is located in the Mojave Desert and features a  oval track, a Vehicle Dynamics Area, a vehicle-handling course inside the oval track, a paved hill road, and several special surface roads. A  complex featuring offices and indoor testing areas is located on the premises as well. The facility was built at a cost of $50 million.

In the 2021 review of WIPO's annual World Intellectual Property Indicators Hyundai ranked as 4th in the world for its 141 industrial design registrations being published under the Hague System during 2020. This position is up on their previous 7th-place ranking for 57 industrial design registrations being published in 2019.

Business

In 1998, after a shake-up in the South Korean auto industry caused by overambitious expansion and the Asian financial crisis, Hyundai acquired the majority of rival Kia Motors.

In 2000, the company established a strategic alliance with DaimlerChrysler and severed its partnership with the Hyundai Group. In 2001, the Daimler-Hyundai Truck Corporation was formed. In 2004, however, DaimlerChrysler divested its interest in the company by selling its 10.5% stake for $900 million.

Hyundai has invested in manufacturing plants in North America, India, the Czech Republic, Russia, China and Turkey as well as research and development centers in Europe, Asia, North America and the Pacific Rim. In 2004, Hyundai Motor Company had $57.2 billion in sales in South Korea making it the country's second largest corporation, or chaebol, after Samsung. Worldwide sales in 2005 reached 2,533,695 units, an 11 percent increase over the previous year. In 2011, Hyundai sold 4.05 million cars worldwide and the Hyundai Motor Group was the world's fourth largest automaker behind GM, Volkswagen and Toyota. Hyundai vehicles are sold in 193 countries through some 5,000 dealerships.

In February 2021, CNBC reported that Apple and Hyundai-Kia are close to finalizing a deal to build an autonomous Apple car. The vehicle was said to be completely designed by Apple and would be built in Hyundai or Kia plants, and could potentially go into production in 2024. However, Hyundai Motor announced shortly after that it is no longer in talks with Apple.

In June 2021, Hyundai Motor Group completed its acquisition of a controlling interest in the robotics firm, Boston Dynamics. Hyundai Motor Group now takes an 80% share of the company.

Board of directors

As of 16 May 2020:
 Chung Eui-sun, chairman of Hyundai Motors
 Won Hee Lee, president and CEO of Hyundai Motors
 Albert Biermann, president of R&D
 Eon Tae Ha, president of domestic production
 Sang-Hyun Kim, CFO of Hyundai Motors
 Eun Soo Choi, former president of the Daejon High Court
 Dong Kyu Lee, former secretary-general of the Fair Trade Commission (South Korea)
 Byung Kook Lee, former Commissioner of the Seoul Regional Tax Office
 Chi-Won Yoon, CEO of UBS Asia-Pacific
 Eugene Ohr, former partner at Capital Group Companies International
 Sang-Seung Yi, Professor of Economics, Seoul National University

Design emphasis

In 2006, Hyundai hired Thomas Bürkle as head of the company's design center in Rüsselsheim, Germany. Bürkle had previously worked for BMW, having designed the BMW 3 Series (E46), and the BMW 6 Series (E63). Hyundai's current design philosophy is known as Fluidic Sculpture, which is heavily inspired by nature.

In 2018, the company announced the Sensuous Sportiness next-generation design direction. The design philosophy was unveiled at the 2018 Geneva Motor Show demonstrated by the Le Fil Rouge concept car, and has been rolled out into their recent models, ranging from sedans to SUVs. The Sensuous Sportiness design identity and strategy has won Design Management Institute's (DMI) Design Value Award 2020.

Regional operations

North America

United States
Hyundai Motor America began selling cars in the United States on 20 February 1986, with a single model, the Hyundai Excel. That year, Hyundai set a record of selling the most automobiles in its first year of business in the United States compared to any other car brand; total sales in 1986 were 168,882.

Initially well received, the Excel's faults soon became apparent; cost-cutting measures caused reliability to suffer. With an increasingly poor reputation for quality, Hyundai sales plummeted, and many dealerships either earned their profits on repairs or abandoned the product. At one point, Hyundai became the butt of many jokes (i.e. Hyundai stands for "Hope you understand nothing's driveable and inexpensive").

In response, Hyundai began investing heavily in the quality, design, manufacturing, and long-term research of its vehicles. The company added free maintenance for the first 2 years or 24,000 miles for all its new cars sold, starting with the 1992 model year. It also added a 10-year or  powertrain warranty (known as the Hyundai Advantage) to its vehicles sold in the United States, it is now known as the America Best Warranty.

Hyundai incorporated a new manufacturing facility, Hyundai Motor Manufacturing Alabama, in April 2002. The new plant in Montgomery, Alabama, was completed during 2004, at a cost of $1.7 billion. Production started in May 2005. It employed more than 3,000 workers in 2012.

By 2004, sales had dramatically increased, and the reputation of Hyundai cars improved. In 2004, Hyundai tied with Honda for initial brand quality in a survey/study from J.D. Power and Associates, for having 102 problems per 1000 vehicles. This made Hyundai second in the industry, only behind Toyota, for initial vehicle quality. The company continued this tradition by placing third overall in J.D. Power's 2006 Initial Quality Survey, behind only Porsche and Lexus.

In 2009, the Hyundai Genesis luxury sedan was named 2009 North American Car of the Year, the first for Hyundai. The model has received a number of well-recognized automobile awards worldwide. It also won the 2009 Canadian Car of the Year after winning its category of Best New Luxury Car under $50,000. The Hyundai's V8 Tau engine in the Genesis received 2009 Ward's 10 Best Engines award.

In January 2012, the Hyundai Elantra was named the North American Car of the Year at the North American International Auto Show, selling more than 200,000 cars since the model's redesigned debut.

An urban air mobility (UAM) subsidiary called Supernal was established in 2020. The name means 'Best Quality' and 'Heavenly'.

Canada

The second-generation Hyundai Pony was available for sale in Canada starting with the 1984 model year. The Canadian Pony differed from its European counterparts by having 8 km/h bumpers, sealed-beam headlights, side marker lamps, and slightly different instrumentation and interior trim. Sales projections for 1984 called for 5,000 Ponys, but actual sales were closer to 25,000, making the Pony one of Canada's best-selling cars that year. A lesser-known model, also sold in Canada, was the Hyundai Stellar. Both models were available until 1987, when they were replaced by the Excel.

In 1989, Hyundai Auto Canada Inc. opened a stamping and assembly plant in Bromont, Quebec, employing 800. The plant cost $387.7 million, with Quebec and Canadian federal government subsidies of $131 million. The plant was designed to manufacture approximately 2000 Hyundai Sonatas per week. Subsequently, Chrysler and Hyundai considered a joint venture that would have Chrysler rebranding the Sonata manufactured at Bromont – only to later announce the deal had failed. The Bromont plant was operational for four years before it closed – with Hyundai's sales unable to support the plant. With boost in sales in 2009, Hyundai Auto Canada Inc. is currently planning to build a new plant in Canada and resume production in Canada. Hyundai subsequently sold the plant, which was eventually purchased by Olymbec inc, a Quebec real estate developer. Hyundai is the No. 1 import car brand in Canada without a local plant. Sales over 100,000 cars-per-year mark in 2012.

Mexico
Hyundai Motor México entered the Mexican market in 2014 with the imported vehicles such as Grand i10, the Elantra, and the ix35. Soon afterwards, the Hyundai Sonata joined the lineup. Prior to the introduction of the Hyundai brand for non-commercial vehicles, Hyundai passenger vehicles, light-duty cargo vans, and passenger vans were distributed by Chrysler de México, branded as Dodge.

South America

Brazil

In October 2012, Hyundai launched a new small bi-fuel car, the HB20, designed specifically for the Brazilian mass-market. The car was developed under the "Projeto HB" (Hyundai Brazil) project, and is built at a new Hyundai factory in Brazil, located in Piracicaba, São Paulo. The plant is the first wholly owned Hyundai plant in Latin America. With an investment of around R$1.2 billion, the plant has the capacity to produce 180,000 cars per year under three shifts.

Hyundai vehicles have also been produced in Brazil by local partner, Caoa Group at a plant located in Anápolis, Goiás. Production here started with the HR model in 2007, and continued with the Tucson in 2010, the HD78 truck in 2011, and the ix35 in 2013.

Asia

China

Hyundai cars, including those made by Hyundai's affiliate, Kia Motors, sold well in China until 2016, when sales fell by half, marking the start of a slump that continued into 2019, when the company announced plans to cut jobs in the region.

Hyundai is currently working with its Chinese partner Beijing Automobile Industry Holding Co. to develop an electric car for sale only in China. In September 2011, it was announced that Korean actor Lee Min-ho, who has enjoyed popularity in China, would promote Hyundai's new 'Veloster' in China.

Hyundai and its sister company, Kia, were reported to have lost market share from 2017 because of their over-reliance on sedans, poor brand images and local Chinese automakers compete with price-competitive SUVs.

Beijing Hyundai 

Hyundai formed a 50-50 joint venture with Beijing Automotive Group since 2002 to produce cars in China. The joint venture is called Beijing Hyundai, which also manufactures several models which are exclusive to the Chinese market. It began operations in China by producing Sonata in December 2002.
The joint venture sold 700,000 passenger cars in 2010, 855,995 car sales in 2012, and 2014 saw the company sell 1,120,000 vehicles. Currently, the company operates five plants, three which is located in Beijing, one in Hubei, and another in Chongqing.

Hawtai partnership 
Between 2002 and 2010, Hawtai Motor had produced Chinese-market versions of the Hyundai Matrix, the Hyundai Santa Fe and the Hyundai Terracan. The Santa Fe was the fifth most-purchased SUV in China in 2010, and some of Hawtai's versions may greatly differ from those sold in other markets. Hyundai ended its partnership with Hawtai in 2010.

Commercial vehicles
In October 2010, Hyundai signed an agreement with Sichuan Nanjun Automobile on setting up a commercial vehicle joint venture—Sichuan Hyundai Motor Co. Ltd.

India

Hyundai Motor India Limited (HMIL) was formed on 6 May 1996. During the entry of Hyundai in 1996, fellow South Korean Daewoo had entered the Indian automobile market just three years before, while Ford, Opel and Honda had entered less than a year back. Hyundai's first car in the country, the Hyundai Santro was launched on 23 September 1998 and was considered a success. It became the second best-selling car in the country from 2000.

Hyundai Motor India Limited is currently the second largest auto exporter from India. It is making India the global manufacturing base for small cars.

Hyundai has two manufacturing plants in India located at Sriperumbudur in the Indian state of Tamil Nadu. Both plants have a combined annual capacity of 600,000 units. In the year 2007, Hyundai opened its R&D facility in Hyderabad, employing now nearly 450 engineers from different parts of the country. Hyundai Motor India Engineering (HMIE) gives technical & engineering support in vehicle development to Hyundai's main R&D centre in Namyang, Korea.

In 2007, Hyundai started its support engineering centre with CAD/CAE teams in Hyderabad, India. Hyundai expanded its engineering activities in India with Vehicle Engineering team in 2010. In 2011, Hyundai started its design activities at Hyderabad R&D Centre with Styling, Digital Design & Skin CAD Teams and Packaging team. Indian engineers are heavily involved in the making of Indian-oriented Hyundai vehicles including the i10, i20, along with other global cars.

In June 2017, The Competition Commission of India imposed ₹87 crore ($13.6 million) penalty for unfair business practices with respect to providing discounts for cars.

Japan
Hyundai Motors restarted passenger vehicle sales in Japan in 2022, after leaving the market in 2009. Since the relaunch, only electric cars are available, and the sales are online-only. 

Despite having growing sales worldwide, Hyundai struggled in Japan, having sold only 15,095 passenger cars from 2001 to 2009. Following an announcement in November 2009, Hyundai pulled their passenger car division out of the Japanese market and focused on their commercial vehicle division instead. The company said that it is possible for them to come back to Japan fully if market conditions continue to improve. 

According to the newspaper The Chosun Ilbo, the reason for Hyundai's failure in the car market was due to the company's inability to recognize the value of small cars due to parking spaces. For instance, actor Bae Yong-joon was hired to endorse the mid-sized Sonata in Japan to appeal to housewives who watched the drama Winter Sonata. The marketing campaign backfired, as large sedans are driven primarily by middle-aged men, while housewives prefer compact cars. In addition, the Sonata was priced too similarly to its Japanese rivals, which resulted in poor sales.

On February 9, 2022, Hyundai announced a comeback to Japan by marketing eco-friendly vehicles like the Ioniq 5 and Nexo with pre-orders from May 2022 for delivery beginning in July 2022 under the company name Hyundai Mobility Japan. As of 2022, Hyundai Mobility Japan operates an office and R&D center in Yokohoma.

Philippines
Hyundai first entered the Philippine market with the Hyundai Excel compact car and the Hyundai Grace van in the early 1990s, later introducing the Hyundai Starex and the second generation Hyundai Elantra towards the end of the decade. Their assembly plant in Santa Rosa, Laguna produced the Hyundai Accent, Hyundai H100, and the Hyundai H350. , there are 39 dealerships around the country but it will be expected to increase to 44 by the end of the year. HARI currently focuses on Jeepneys, Trucks and Buses, while HMPH focuses on Cars, SUVs and Passenger Vans.

Hyundai Asia Resources, Inc. (HARI) was the distributor of Hyundai passenger cars and currently the official distributor of Hyundai commercial vehicles in the country. They were appointed by Hyundai Motor Company of South Korea in August 2001 as the official distributor of Hyundai vehicles in the Philippines. It had earned its spot as the third top player in the Philippine automotive industry. But due to the outrage of COVID-19 pandemic, they decided to abandon the passenger car market which resulted to their sales decline and the numerous of controversies surrounds them even before the pandemic. HARI has expected sales to be further boosted by its Hyundai Modern Jeepneys with the implementation of the Public Utility Vehicle Modernization Program. HARI targets to sell more modern jeepneys as the government pushes for the Public Utility Vehicle Modernization Program to replace the country's aging jeepneys.

In early 2022, Hyundai Motor Philippines, Inc. (HMPH) became the official distributor of Hyundai passenger cars in the country after the company was able to take over its passenger car operations from HARI, Audrey Byun is the CEO, while Lee Dong-wook is the President and Victor Jose Vela is the Deputy General Manager of the company. They started their operations on 1 June 2022, and also, they have unveiled 4 new models, which are the following: the Creta subcompact crossover, the Tucson compact crossover, the Santa Fe mid-size crossover and the Staria passenger van through a dealer conference on 20 June 2022. Meanwhile, the sales of these cars in dealerships will begin in July 2022.

Indonesia

In November 2019, Hyundai announced that it is building the first wholly owned Southeast Asian car plant located in Indonesia. The HMMI is built in Cikarang, Bekasi and will fully operate in the second half of 2021 with the annual capacity of 150,000 vehicles. Half of the output would be exported to the neighbouring countries in Southeast Asia. A total of US$1.55 billion (Rp 21.7 trillion) would be invested to the plant along with the future product developments until 2030. HMMI would produce a region-specific compact MPV among other models.

Turkey

In September 1997, Hyundai opened a manufacturing plant in Turkey, located in İzmit, Kocaeli Province. The facility, named Hyundai Assan Otomotiv, was built as a 50-50% joint venture between the Hyundai Motor Company and the Kibar Holding of Turkey, the first stage investment raising to US$180 million. It currently has an annual production capacity of 125,000 units and it manufactured the Accent, the H-100, the Starex, the Matrix and since 2010, the i20. In May 2013, Hyundai Turkey Izmit plant capacity was increased to up to 200,000 units with 470 million Euro investment. The i10 and i20 were started to be produced in the plant.

Europe

Germany
Hyundai has been operating an R&D centre in Frankfurt, Germany since 1994, that has been responsible for monitoring technology developments in Europe and designing and engineering new cars for the European market. In September 2003, the company opened its new European headquarters in Rüsselsheim, after an investment worth 50 million euro. The site became the new location for the R&D centre and for the world rally team of the company.

Czech Republic

In November 2008, Hyundai opened its European plant in Nošovice, Czech Republic, following an investment of over 1 billion euros and over two years of construction. The plant, which mainly manufactures the i30, ix20, ix35 for the European market, has an annual capacity of 300,000 cars. The new Hyundai plant is 90 kilometres north of Kia Motors' Žilina Plant in Slovakia.

Russia

In Russia, the production of the Hyundai Accent, Sonata, Elantra and Santa Fe models has been taking place at the TagAZ plant, located in Taganrog, since 2001, in the form of complete knock-down kits assembly. Since 2006, the factory has also been assembling the Hyundai Porter, County, Aero Town and the HD 500 commercial vehicles.

In June 2008, Hyundai started the construction of a new manufacturing plant in Saint Petersburg with a planned yearly capacity of 100,000 cars, that will eventually be increased to 200,000 units. It started mass production in January 2011, with two models: the Hyundai Solaris and the Kia Rio.

In September 2021, Hyundai Wia division opened a car engine manufacturing plant in Saint Petersburg, the biggest in Russia and the fifth in the world. The new plant is designed to produce about 330.000 engines for Hyundai Solaris and Creta as well as for Kia Rio by the end of the year 2021. The construction of the plant began in December 2019.

Africa

Southern Africa
In Botswana, the assembly of Hyundai Accent, Sonata, and Elantra models was undertaken by the Motor Company of Botswana at their Gaborone plant, since February 1993, in the form of complete knock-down kits. Almost all of the finished vehicles were exported across Botswana's border to South Africa, where the vast majority of dealerships are situated.

Egypt
Hyundai cars are also manufactured in Egypt, the local manufacturer is the Ghabbour Group, which is located in Cairo. They have a big model range and offers sports models of some car models which are only offered on the Egypt market. Formerly, the company had assembled vehicles such as the Verna.

Product line 
Hyundai produces sedans, hatchbacks, crossover SUVs, vans, pickups, heavy trucks and buses in numerous plants worldwide.

Cars 

Its top-selling sedan, according to the company's sales data in 2021 was the Elantra (Avante in South Korea), which recorded 380,907 units. This model was produced in several plants, including in South Korea, United States, China, among others. Another popular sedan model is the Accent/Verna, which is popular in emerging markets including China, India, Middle East, as well as developed markets like North America. This model ceased to be produced in South Korea in 2019, as its production base were moved to Mexico and India.

Other sedan models are the mid-size Sonata, executive Grandeur, and several China-oriented models which consist of Reina, Celesta, Lafesta, and Mistra.

Some hatchback models developed by Hyundai have been divided into models developed to cater to the Indian market and the European market. Both the i10 and i20 are models built in India and Europe, with several changes between the Indian and European versions to ensure the model could fit according to each market. Other hatchback models include the entry-level Santro first introduced in 1998 for the Indian market, i30 C-segment car for developed markets, the HB20 for the Brazilian market, and the hatchback version of Accent for markets outside India and Europe.

Crossovers/SUVs 

Hyundai entered the crossover SUV market early with the Santa Fe in 2000, followed by the smaller Tucson in 2004. The Santa Fe was a huge hit with American and European markets, despite receiving criticism in the past for Hyundai's obscure looks. It quickly became Hyundai's best seller and was one of the reasons Hyundai survived despite having their sales declined. As of 2020, Hyundai has sold more than 5,260,000 units of Santa Fe globally.

The first-generation Tucson shared its Elantra-based platform with the Kia Sportage. In most countries apart from South Korea and the United States, the Tucson was retired for the Hyundai ix35 from 2009 to 2015. However, the Tucson name was restored for the third generation, where it was to be used across all markets. It was unveiled at the Geneva Motor Show in 2015. The Tucson is the fourth best-selling SUV in the world in 2020, with a total sales of 451,703 units, below the Toyota RAV4, Honda CR-V, and Volkswagen Tiguan.

By mid-2010s, Hyundai moved into developing smaller crossover SUV models, starting from the Creta (ix25 in China) from 2014, and the Kona in 2017. The Kona is also consisted of a hybrid electric and a pure battery electric variant. By 2019, both model became the third and fourth-best selling vehicle of the brand, while the Creta has been the best-selling SUV in Russia since 2016, and India in 2020. In 2021, Hyundai released its first crossover SUV model in the South Korean light car segment, the Casper. It is the first venture of the brand in the segment in 15 years, and also the smallest automobile the brand produces of any kind.

Currently, Hyundai produces 12 crossover SUV models for different markets.

Hybrid and electric vehicles 

Hyundai Motor Company began developing flexible-fuel vehicles (FFVs) in 1988. The test vehicle was 1991 MY Scoupe FFV. Since March 1992, in Seoul, Korea, through at least November 1993, field trials of several FFVs had been performed over more than 30,000 miles.

The new hybrid-electric FGV-1 was unveiled at the Seoul Motor Show in 1995 which featured full-time electric drive technology. The 1995 FGV-1 was the result of Hyundai's first experiments with hybrid propulsion systems in 1994. The FGV-2 was the second vehicle to be produced.  The company is using the "parallel" type design, which utilizes either the internal combustion engine or the electric motor. Others are the Elantra HEV and the Hyundai Accent HEV, which were unveiled in 1999 and 2000, respectively.

The first pure electric car developed by Hyundai was the Sonata Electric Vehicle in 1991. The car started as a Sonata sedan-based model. Hyundai planned to have six electric vehicles available for testing by the end of 1992.

Hyundai began mass-producing hybrid electric vehicles in 2008. The company is using Hybrid Blue Drive, which includes lithium polymer batteries, as opposed to lithium-ion. The new hybrid Sonata made its debut at the Los Angeles International Auto Show in November 2008. The 2011 Sonata Hybrid sales in the U.S. began in February 2011.

In 2009, Hyundai released the Avante LPI Hybrid in the South Korean domestic market in July. Hyundai showcased also the Hyundai BlueOn, an electric prototype of i10, was first unveiled at the Frankfurt Motor Show in 2009. At the 2010 Geneva Motor Show, Hyundai unveiled the i-flow, a concept car using a variant of the BLUE-WILL hybrid system.

, cumulative global sales of hybrid models totaled 200,000 units, including both Hyundai Motors and Kia Motors hybrid models.

In 2016, Hyundai revealed the Ioniq five-door liftback to rival the Toyota Prius. The nameplate Ioniq is a portmanteau of ion and unique. It is the first automobile to be offered in hybrid, plug-in hybrid, and all-electric variants with no "standard" internal combustion engine only version. The hybrid variant launched in its home market in February 2016, followed by the electric model in July 2016. The plug-in hybrid version followed in February 2017.

In August 2020, the company announced the launch of Ioniq as its own new electric brand and confirmed three new electric cars that will be sold under the sub-brand. Ioniq is Hyundai's second stand-alone brand after the Genesis. The new brand is going to utilise Hyundai's Electric Global Modular Platform (E-GMP), which they claims will enable "fast charging capability and plentiful driving range." The automaker said the first of the three new global models will be the Ioniq 5, a midsize crossover, arriving in early 2021. It will be followed by the Ioniq 6 sedan in late 2022, and then by the Ioniq 7, a large SUV, in early 2024. New models will be named numerically, with even numbers for sedans, and odd numbers for SUVs.

In December 2020, Hyundai Motor Group announced details about its E-GMP platform that will be the underpinning of new Hyundai and Kia electric vehicles starting in 2021. Apart from Hyundai, Ioniq, and Kia brands, it will also be used for future Genesis electric cars. The platform's main components is a battery pack under the cabin and an all-in-one motor, transmission, and inverter designed and developed by Hyundai. By bundling the components, Hyundai said, it raised the maximum speed of the motor by up to 70 percent compared to existing motors, despite its small size.

In February 2020, Hyundai launched its first vehicle built above the E-GMP platform, the Ioniq 5. It is the first product to be marketed under the Ioniq sub-brand. At its introduction, it is the most advanced electric vehicle produced by Hyundai. Its battery can be charged from 10 to 80 percent in 18 minutes with its 800 V charging capabilities by using a 350-kW charger. A five minutes charge will add  to its range by WLTP standards.

In July 2022, Hyundai announced its new automotive factory in South Korea, solely dedicated for electric vehicles and with production set to begin in 2025. It will be the first Hyundai plant to open in South Korea since 1996.

Hyundai is currently expanding its full-electric lineup to include the Ioniq 6, which will debut in Europe in the second half of 2022, and the Ioniq 7, which is projected to hit the market in 2024.

Hydrogen vehicles 

In March 2018, Hyundai launched a hydrogen powered crossover SUV the Nexo. In October 2020, South Korean domestic sales of the Nexo exceeded 10,000 vehicles. As of July 2020, Hyundai had exported only 769 vehicles to the United States and Europe with supply limited due to domestic demand.

In 2020, Hyundai launched a hydrogen powered version of its Xcient truck the Xcient Fuel Cell delivering seven vehicles to customers in Switzerland. The Xcient Fuel Cell is the world's first production hydrogen fuel cell truck. In 2019, Hyundai formed Hyundai Hydrogen Mobility (HHM) together with Swiss company H2 Energy to lease trucks to Swiss customers with plans to deliver 50 trucks by 2020. Hyundai chose to launch in Switzerland as its road tax does not apply to zero-emission trucks and for its ability to produce hydrogen using hydropower. HHM formed a partnership with Hydrospider, a joint venture of H2Energy, Alpiq and Linde to produce hydrogen and to build hydrogen refuelling infrastructure in Switzerland.

In 2020, Hyundai launched a hydrogen powered version of its Elec City bus the Elec City FCEV that has a capacity of 44 passengers with 24 seats and 20 standing seats. In 2020, Hyundai exported two buses to Saudi Arabian oil company Saudi Aramco for demonstration.

In December 2021, Hyundai suspended development of its Genesis, and possibly its other, hydrogen cars.

Light commercial vehicles 
Hyundai Motor started production of the H350 van (also called Solati) in Turkey from 2015.

Trucks and buses 

Under the Truck & Bus division, Hyundai produces several heavy trucks and buses. The company started selling trucks in 1969 with the D-750/800, followed by the R-182 as their first bus in 1970.

A joint venture called the Daimler-Hyundai Truck Corporation was established between Hyundai and Daimler AG in 2000 to produce high-tech middle-range trucks and buses in the Korean market beginning in 2004. However, after numerous delays and disputes, the planned venture was cancelled in 2004, with DaimlerChrysler selling its 10.65 percent stake in Hyundai Motor.

Environmental record 
On 23 April 2008, Hyundai Motor announced the beginning of a five-year project to turn 50 km2 of infertile land into grassland by 2012. Hyundai is doing so with the help of the Korean Federation for Environmental Movement (KFEM). The project, named Hyundai Green Zone, is located 660 km north of Beijing. The goal of the project is to end the recurring dust storms in Beijing, block desertification and protect the local ecosystem. Local weeds will be planted in the region that have the ability to endure sterile alkaline soil. This is the first environmental project of the company's social contribution programme.

Motorsport

Hyundai entered motorsport by competing in the F2 class of the World Rally Championship in 1998 and 1999. In September 1999, Hyundai unveiled the Accent WRC, a World Rally Car based on the Hyundai Accent. The Hyundai World Rally Team debuted the car at the 2000 Swedish Rally and achieved their first top-ten result at that year's Rally Argentina, when Alister McRae and Kenneth Eriksson finished seventh and eighth, respectively. Eriksson later drove the car to fifth place in New Zealand and fourth in Australia. In 2001, Hyundai debuted a new evolution of the Accent WRC, which was intended to improve reliability, but the performance of the car was still not good enough to challenge the four big teams (Ford, Mitsubishi, Peugeot and Subaru). However, at the season-ending Rally GB, the team achieved their best result with McRae finishing fourth and Eriksson sixth.

For the 2002 season, Hyundai hired the four-time world champion Juha Kankkunen, along with Freddy Loix and Armin Schwarz. Kankkunen's fifth place in New Zealand was the team's best result, but they managed to edge out Škoda and Mitsubishi by one point in the battle for fourth place in the manufacturers' world championship. In September 2003, after a season hampered by budget constraints, Hyundai announced withdrawal from the WRC and planned to return in 2006, which did not happen.

In 2006, following the announcement that Korea was scheduled to earn a Formula One Grand Prix, Hyundai planned to enter the sport. The Korean Grand Prix was first held in 2010, but Hyundai have not entered the championship. Hyundai announced they would be revealing their future rally plans at the 2011 Chicago Auto Show, on 9 February. The current plans for rallying are focused around the newest Hyundai release, the Veloster. In September 2012 Hyundai announced that they were due to start the WRC with a rally model of its i20 to rival the likes of the Ford Fiesta, the Citroen DS3 and the Mini Countryman.

 Hyundai i20 WRC 

The Hyundai i20 WRC is a World Rally Car built by Hyundai for use in the 2014 World Rally Championship. It is based on the Hyundai i20 subcompact car, and was unveiled at the 2012 Paris Motor Show. The launch of the i20 marks Hyundai's return to the World Rally Championship after a ten-year absence. The car is scheduled to make its first competitive appearance at the 2014 Rallye Monte Carlo, but may compete during the 2013 season to aid development.

The car will be operated by Hyundai's performance division, Hyundai Motorsport from a base in Frankfurt, Germany.

Marketing

Corporate social responsibility
In 2008, Hyundai Motors established a committee to oversee its Corporate Social Responsibility programme. Among the programme's initiatives have been the "Happy Move Global Youth Volunteers Program".

The Hyundai Motors' India Foundation (HMIF) has invested more than 20 million rupees in various corporate social responsibility programmes in India. In 2011, it started the "Go Green" village adoption project in Tamil Nadu. Its aim was to promote environmentally friendly products, increase the forest cover in Tamil Nadu, and improve living and hygiene conditions in the region's villages. A number of schools have been adopted for improvement with the HMIF donating around 450 benches to government schools and drilling 10 bore wells.

In 2020, Hyundai Motors signed a contract with UN Development Programme and launched a campaign ‘for Tomorrow’ in 2021 to create and realize a solution for problems that global society faces. In 2022, the documentary film 'for Tomorrow' was released which contains the main story of the 'for Tomorrow' project.

Sports sponsorship

 BCCI
 Jeonbuk Hyundai Motors FC
 FIFA
 International Cricket Council
 UEFA
 FIFA World Cup (since 2002)
 Cricket World Cup
 UEFA European Championship (since 2000)
 Korea Football Association
 A-League
 Inside the NBA
 National Football League
 Sun Bowl
 Hyundai Tournament of Champions
 Olympique Lyonnais (from 2013 to 2020)
 PFC CSKA Moscow
 Millonarios Fútbol Club
 Club Universitario de Deportes
 Tampines Rovers FC
 Al-Fateh SC
 Moroka Swallows F.C.
 Mandurah City FC
 Park United FC
 Carlton Football Club
 Brisbane Lions
 Brisbane Broncos
 AS Cannes Volley-Ball
 Hyundai Hockey Helpers
 Rhys Millen
Atlético Madrid
Hertha BSC
Chelsea FC
AS Roma

Other sponsorships
 Academy Awards
 CNN Worldwide
 Hyundai Auto Club Philippines

Controversies

Inflated fuel economy numbers
After an investigation in 2012, the EPA found that 35% of all 2011–2013 Hyundai and Kia vehicles had inflated fuel economy numbers; by as much as six miles per gallon. Currently, Hyundai and Kia have started a reimbursement programme for the owners of the 2011–2013 affected vehicles.
 In 2014 the company was issued $350 million in penalties by the US government, agreed to pay $395 million in 2013 to resolve claims from vehicles owners, and agreed to pay $41.2 million to cover the "investigative costs" of 33 US state attorneys general.

Wrongly advertised engine and horsepower
Several consumers complained that the engine delivered with the Hyundai Veloster in Brazil was inferior to the one advertised. Independent tests confirmed that it was not the same engine, and it delivered only 121 CV (119 HP) instead of the advertised 140 CV (138 HP), with the car earning derogatory nicknames like Slowster in the Brazilian market.

Marketing controversy
In April 2013, Hyundai Motors UK released a commercial depicting a man attempting to commit suicide via carbon monoxide poisoning in an ix35, only to fail to do so because of the vehicle's non-toxic emissions. The advert, produced by Hyundai's in-house agency Innocean Worldwide, received widespread criticism for promoting suicide. Hyundai has since taken down the video and issued a formal apology.

Underage workers
In July 2022, Reuters reported that SMART, a Hyundai subsidiary in Luverne, Alabama, U.S.A. had hired minors as young as 12 years old to work in one of its metal stamping plants. The subsidiary supplies parts for Hyundai's nearby assembly plant in Montgomery. A former employee of SMART said that there were around 50 underage workers, some of which were children of Guatemalan migrants. The report was confirmed by "area police, the family of three underage workers, and eight former and current employees of the factory." In response, Hyundai said the company "does not tolerate illegal employment practices at any Hyundai entity" and that it is "unaware of any evidence of the allegations." SMART stated separately that it follows the law and denied knowingly employing "anyone who is ineligible for employment." It expects the temporary work agencies that fill its jobs to "follow the law in recruiting, hiring, and placing workers." State and federal labor laws limit minors younger than 18 from working in metal stamping and pressing jobs near dangerous machinery. Alabama also requires children 17 and under to be enrolled in school, which some of the underage workers had to forego in order to work long shifts at the plant. Following the report, a California Hyundai owner filed a class action lawsuit against Hyundai claiming that "Defendants materially omit and fail to disclose that Class Vehicles are manufactured using child labor" and that Hyundai owners and lessees were harmed as a result.

See also

 Bering Truck Corporation
 Hyundai Group
 Hyundai Mobis
 Hyundai Motor Group
 Kia Motors
 List of Hyundai engines
 List of Korean car makers
 List of Hyundai Motor Company transmissions
 List of Hyundai distributors world wide

Notes

References

External links

 
Bus manufacturers of South Korea
Car brands
Car manufacturers of South Korea
Companies listed on the Korea Exchange
Companies listed on the London Stock Exchange
Luxury motor vehicle manufacturers
Multinational companies headquartered in South Korea
South Korean brands
South Korean companies established in 1967
Truck manufacturers of South Korea
Vehicle manufacturing companies established in 1967
Motor vehicle engine manufacturers
Engine manufacturers of South Korea